Deströyer 666 is an Australian extreme metal band formed in 1994 by vocalist and guitarist K. K. Warslut. The group originated in Melbourne, Australia and by 2001 had relocated to Europe.

History 
K. K. Warslut formed Deströyer 666 following his departure from the black metal band Bestial Warlust. Initially the project was a solo venture but eventually a black-death-thrash metal band was formed in 1994 in Melbourne. The group's debut EP, Violence is the Prince of this World featured Warslut on guitar, bass and vocals, with Matt Skitz (aka Matt Sanders) from Damaged and Criss Volcano from Abominator on drums. The song "The Eternal Glory of War" was later re-recorded for their 2000 album Phoenix Rising.

Following their debut release, Deströyer 666 had a line-up of Warslut; bassist Bullet Eater (aka Phil Gresik, ex-Bestial Warlust, Hobbs' Angel of Death, Mass Confusion); Gospel of the Horns' drummer Howitzer; and guitarist Shrapnel. They recorded the group's first studio album, Unchain the Wolves (1997). Soon after Howitzer was replaced by Deceiver and during 1999 Deströyer 666 recorded Phoenix Rising, though it was not released until more than a year later. K.K. Warslut also joined neo-Nazi metal musician Scott McGuinness, of Fortress fame, in the band Raven's Wing, which released one album, Through the Looking Glass, in 1997.

During 2000, Deströyer 666 toured Europe extensively. Dutch drummer Erich de Windt of Sinister and Prostitute Disfigurement joined the band after the recording of the EP King of Kings. Gresik left to be replaced by Simon Berserker. Phoenix Rising was released by Season of Mist in November. De Windt was replaced by German drummer Mersus in 2001 and Deströyer 666 toured through Europe again with Immolation and Deranged, after which the band left Australia to relocate to Europe. Warslut settled in Eindhoven in the Netherlands and Shrapnel began living in London.

The 2002 album Cold Steel... for an Iron Age featured cover art, which the band has since disavowed, claiming they never approved it. A reissue of the album was scheduled for late 2005 but as of May 2009, it had not appeared. It is supposed to feature all new artwork as well as bonus songs. The next album, Defiance, was released in June 2009. It is their first album where none of the music was composed by Warslut, whereas he has concentrated on the lyrics as usual with the music composed by Shrapnel and Matt Razor. The album has been very well received by both fans and critics to keep Deströyer 666 well in the bracket of the cult act they have become.

In 2010, the group released a compilation album, "To the Devil His Due" which contains all of the tracks previously available only on 7" vinyl EPs. Deströyer 666's lyrical themes deal with blasphemy, nihilism, Nietzsche and warlike subjects.

In August 2012, it was announced that Shrapnel left the band due to personal reasons.

Deströyer 666 released their latest album, titled Wildfire, on 26 February 2016.

On 2 December 2022, the group released their sixth studio album, Never Surrender. It was promoted by the single "Guillotine", released that September, whose music video featured footage from anti-lockdown protests that had taken place in their home country.

Notable tours and shows 

In 2003, the group undertook an Australian tour that year that culminated in a headlining appearance at the Metal for the Brain festival. Their first North American tour occurred during September and October 2006.

Starting from the first of January 2010, Deströyer 666 returned to their homeland in Australia, first playing Screamfest and then extensively touring the country, including Tasmania. They had not played the continent since 2004.

2010 saw further touring and noteworthy live appearances. They were a highlight at Norway's Inferno Festival in March and followed on a very busy and successful year with a US tour alongside Enthroned and a lengthy European jaunt with Watain.

In 2011, they were scheduled to tour with German thrash band Destruction in the United States. However, due to unforeseen circumstances they had to drop out of the tour.

Controversy 
Deströyer 666, particularly lead singer K. K. Warslut, have espoused Islamophobic, misogynistic, and homophobic messages at their concerts. In 2019, a planned tour of Australia and New Zealand was canceled after the publicizing of some of these incidents.

Members

Current line-up 
 K. K. Warslut – lead vocals, rhythm guitar (1994–present), lead guitar (1994–1996, 2020–present), bass (1994–1995)
 Felipe Plaza – bass, backing vocals (2015–present)
 Kev Desecrator – drums (2020–present, live 2017, 2018–2020)

Former 
 Shrapnel – lead guitar (1996–2012)
 Bullet Eater – bass (1995–1999)
 Simon Berserker – bass (2000–2003)
 Matt Razor – bass (2004–2014)
 Chris Volcano – drums (1994–1995)
 Skitz Sanders – drums (1995)
 Ballistic 'Coz' Howitzer – drums (1996–1998)
 Deceiver – drums (1998–2000), live drums (2018)
 Eric De Windt – drums (2000–2001)
 Mersus – drums (2001–2012)
 Perracide – drums (2012–2017)
 R.C. – lead guitar (2012–2020), backing vocals (2015–2020)

Discography 
Studio albums
Unchain the Wolves (1997)
Phoenix Rising (2000)
Cold Steel... for an Iron Age (2002)
Defiance (2009)
Wildfire (2016)
Never Surrender (2022)

Extended plays
Violence Is the Prince of This World (1995)
Terror Abraxas (2003)
Call of the Wild (2018)

Demo
Six Songs with the Devil (1994)

Compilations
To the Devil His Due (2011)

Singles
Satanic Speed Metal (1998)
King of Kings / Lord of the Wild (2000)
...of Wolves, Women & War (2002)

References

External links 

Musical groups established in 1994
Australian thrash metal musical groups
Australian heavy metal musical groups
Australian black metal musical groups
Victoria (Australia) musical groups
Musical quartets
Season of Mist artists
1994 establishments in Australia